Raoul Schrott (born 17 January 1964) is an Austrian poet, writer, literary critic, translator and broadcast personality.

Schrott was raised in Tunis where his father served as an Austrian sales representative. He attended the universities of Norwich, Paris, Berlin and Innsbruck. He completed a thesis on "Dada 1921 – 1922 in Tirol". He translated Homer's writings into colloquial German. In 2008 he was appointed Visiting professor by the Free University Berlin. In 2019 he was a contributor to A New Divan: A Lyrical Dialogue Between East and West (Gingko Library). He lives in Austria.

Awards 
Award of the Country of Carinthia at the Ingeborg-Bachmann-Competition, 1994
Leonce-und-Lena-Preis 1995
Rauris Literature Prize, 1996
Sponsorship award of the Friedrich-Hölderlin-Prize 1996
Berlin Literary Award, 1996
Peter-Huchel-Preis, 1999
Mainzer Stadtschreiber, 2004
Joseph-Breitbach-Preis, 2004
Prize of the Guntram and Irene Rinke Foundation, 2007

Works (in German) 
Dada 1921 – 1922 in Tirol. Universität Innsbruck, Dissertation 1988
Dada 21/22. Musikalische Fischsuppe mit Reiseeindrücken. Eine Dokumentation über die beiden Dadajahre in Tirol. Haymon, Innsbruck 1988. 
Makame. Gedichte. Haymon, Innsbruck 1989. 
Walter Serner 1889–1942 und Dada. Ein Forschungsbericht mit neuen Dokumenten. Reihe: Vergessene Autoren der Moderne, 41. Anhang: Gemeinschaftsarbeiten von Arp, Serner und Tzara. Universität Siegen 1989 ISSN 0177-9869
Die Legenden vom Tod. Mit Bildern von Adolf Frohner. Haymon, Innsbruck 1990. 
Dada 15/25. Haymon, Innsbruck 1992. 
Dadautriche 1907–1970. Herausgegeben von Günther Dankl und Raoul Schrott. Mit Beiträgen von Raoul Schrott u. a. Haymon, Innsbruck 1993. 
Sub Rosa. Mit Zeichnungen von Arnold Mario Dall'o. Haymon, Innsbruck 1993. 
Finis Terrae. Ein Nachlass. Haymon, Innsbruck 1995. 
Hotels. Haymon, Innsbruck 1995. 
Die Erfindung der Poesie. Gedichte aus den ersten viertausend Jahren. Reihe: Die Andere Bibliothek, 154. Eichborn, Frankfurt 1997. 
Fragmente einer Sprache der Dichtung im europäischen Kontext. Poetische Strukturen von der griechischen Antike bis zum Dadaismus. Habilitationsschrift. Universität Innsbruck, Innsbruck 1997
Tropen. Über das Erhabene. Hanser, München 1998. 
Die Erde ist blau wie eine Orange. Polemisches, Poetisches, Privates. dtv, München 1999. 
Fragmente einer Sprache der Dichtung. Graz 1997 
Bakchen, nach Euripides. Hanser, München 1999.  (2000 uraufgeführt am Wiener Burgtheater)
Die Musen. Ungekürzte, vom Autor neu durchges. Ausgabe. dtv, München 2000. 
Die Wüste Lop Nor. Novelle. Hanser, München 2000. 
Gilgamesh Epos. Fischer, Frankfurt 2001, 2004.  (uraufgeführt am Wiener Akademietheater)
Das Geschlecht der Engel, der Himmel der Heiligen: ein Brevier. Hanser, München 2001. 
Khamsin. Fischer, Frankfurt 2002.  (Enth. außerdem: Die Namen der Wüste)
Tristan da Cunha oder Die Hälfte der Erde. Roman. Hanser, München 2003. 
Der wölfische Hunger, über das Alter der Jugend. Gollenstein, Blieskastel 2004. 
Weissbuch. Hanser, München 2004. 
Handbuch der Wolkenputzerei. Gesammelte Essays. Hanser, München 2005. 
Die fünfte Welt, ein Logbuch. Haymon, Innsbruck 2007. 
Homers Heimat. Der Kampf um Troia und seine realen Hintergründe. Hanser, München 2008. [18]
Ilias. Neu übertragen von Raoul Schrott. Hanser, München 2008. 
Die Politik des Heiligen in: Lettre International 88, 2010
Die Blüte des nackten Körpers. Liebesgedichte aus dem Alten Ägypten. Übertragen von R. S. Hanser, München 2010. 
Liebesgedichte. Nachwort Oliver Lubrich. Insel, Frankfurt 2010. 
with Arthur Jacobs: Gehirn und Gedicht. Wie wir unsere Wirklichkeit konstruieren, Carl Hanser Verlag, München 2011 
Das schweigende Kind, Erzählung, Carl Hanser Verlag, Munich 2012, 
Erste Erde Epos. Hanser, Munich 2016, 
Eine Geschichte des Windes. Novel, Hanser, Munich 2019

As editor 
Jahrbuch der Lyrik. Ed. with Christoph Buchwald. Fischer, Frankfurt o. M. 1999ff.

Trivia 

 Between 1988 and 2008 Schrott published 22 books.
 Schrott has translated Homer's Iliad into a contemporary German idiom with many colloquialisms.
 Schrott has translated the Epic of Gilgamesh to contemporary German.

References 

1964 births
Living people
Austrian male poets
Alumni of the University of East Anglia
People from Landeck District
Translators of Homer